Berlin is a city along the Androscoggin River in Coös County in northern New Hampshire, United States. It is the northernmost city in New Hampshire. The population was 9,425 at the 2020 census, down from 10,051 at the 2010 census.

It includes the village of Cascade in the south part of the city. Located in New Hampshire's Great North Woods Region or "North Country", Berlin sits at the edge of the White Mountains, and the city's boundaries extend into the White Mountain National Forest. Berlin is home to the Berlin and Coos County Historical Society's Moffett House Museum & Genealogy Center, Service Credit Union Heritage Park, the Berlin Fish Hatchery, and the White Mountains Community College, member of the Community College System of New Hampshire.

Berlin is the principal city of the Berlin Micropolitan Statistical Area, which includes all of Coos County, New Hampshire and Essex County, Vermont. Around 65% of its residents speak a variant of New England French, which is known locally as "Berlin French".

The pronunciation of Berlin was changed to BUR-lin, instead of Ber-LIN (as in Berlin, Germany), during World War I as a patriotic stand against Germany.

History 

 

Around 11,000 years ago, small groups of Native Americans camped around the area of what is now called Berlin. In later years, the Eastern Abenaki tribes came to Berlin to mine rhyolite in Mt. Jasper.

When English colonists came to America, Berlin was first granted on December 31, 1771, by Colonial Governor John Wentworth, as "Maynesborough" after Sir William Mayne.<ref name="1875Berlin">[http://gedcomindex.com/Reference/New_Hampshire_1875/067.html Article in Statistics and Gazetteer of New-Hampshire (1875)]</ref> But the grantees did not take up their claims, which disappeared with the Revolution. In 1802, Seth Eames and Gideon Tirrell were sent by the descendants of Mayne to explore and mark lots for settlers, and still no one came. Maynesborough was settled in 1823–1824 by William Sessions and his nephew, Cyrus Wheeler. Both men were from Gilead, Maine. Farming was the first industry.  With 65 inhabitants in 1829, the New England town was reincorporated on July 1 as Berlin with the help of Cyrus' father, Thomas Wheeler.

Situated in a heavily forested region, the community developed early into a center for logging and wood industries. Falls on the Androscoggin River provided water power for sawmills. In 1826, a road was built to Gorham by Thomas, Amos, and Daniel Green. In 1851, the St. Lawrence & Atlantic Railroad entered Berlin, connecting it to other markets.  Acquiring water, timber, and rail rights in the early 1850s, the H. Winslow & Company built a large sawmill at the head of "Berlin Falls". In 1868, William Wentworth Brown and Lewis T. Brown bought a controlling interest in the business and changed its name to the Berlin Mills Company.

By 1885, the mill town was home to several pulp and paper mills, including the Riverside Mill, Forest Fibre Company and White Mountain Pulp & Paper Company. Because of the need for labor in the mills, immigrants arrived from Russia, Norway, Finland, Italy, Sweden, Ireland, and Germany. Many others were French Canadians from nearby Quebec.

In 1872, a group of Scandinavians founded the nation's oldest ski club, which still exists today. It was originally called the North American Ski Club (in Norwegian, Nordamerikansk Skiklubben), but later was renamed the Nansen Ski Club. This was in honor of Fridtjof Nansen, who in 1888 skied across Greenland.  In 1897, Berlin was incorporated as a city, the northernmost in the state.

As of 1874, the Boston and Maine Railway passed through the eastern portion of the town and operated on this line until the 1980s. The old railroad bed has since been converted for usage as an ATV trail.

Berlin's main industry in the early 20th century was the pulp and paper industries, which have been in a long decline since that time. As jobs left the area, the population has decreased and is about half its peak of more than 20,000 in the 1930 census. In 1917, the Berlin Mills Company was renamed the Brown Company, because of World War I and anti-German feeling against the enemy of the time. A short time after the Great Depression, the Brown Company went into receivership. Surviving with governmental help, it was bought and sold several times after World War II.

In 2001, American Tissue filed for bankruptcy, before which it had stopped paying city taxes. Its facilities were purchased in 2002 by Fraser Papers of Canada. But in March 2006, Fraser Papers announced the closing of Berlin's pulp mill. On May 6, 2006, 250 employees were displaced, some moving to Cascade's paper finishing mill, but most were left unemployed.

On October 3, 2006, the North American Dismantling Corporation of Michigan announced that it had bought the  defunct pulp mill site of Fraser Paper, and would spend a year demolishing the property to allow redevelopment. Laidlaw Energy LLC has since purchased a portion of the former Fraser property, including a large recovery boiler which it intends to convert into a 66-megawatt biomass plant in 2010–2011.

In the 1990s, the local historian and author Paul "Poof" Tardiff began writing articles in The Berlin Daily Sun. He later collected these in a three-volume series titled Once Upon a Berlin Time, which documents local history. He continued to write articles for the newspaper every Tuesday and Thursday until his death in 2018.

Recent economic development has been based on the correctional industry. The 750-bed Northern New Hampshire Correctional Facility was built in 1999 and employs approximately 200 people. In 2012, the Federal Bureau of Prisons opened a federal, 1200-bed medium security facility, which employs approximately 350 people.

 Geography 

Berlin is located at  (44.4686, −71.1839), in northern New Hampshire, north of the White Mountains, in the state's North Country region. The city is bordered to the south by Randolph and Gorham, north by Milan, east by Success and west by Kilkenny. New Hampshire Route 16 passes through the center of the city, leading north to Errol and eventually to Rangeley, Maine, and leading south through Gorham and Pinkham Notch to North Conway and the Seacoast Region of New Hampshire. New Hampshire Route 110 leads northwest out of Berlin through West Milan to Groveton. NH 110 is known locally as the Berlin-Groveton Highway.

Berlin is situated at the confluence of the Androscoggin and Dead rivers. The Mahoosuc Range is to the southeast. Jericho Mountain State Park, created from a city park and from private land in 2005, is west of the city center and features a reservoir created in the 1970s and a network of ATV trails. A prominent feature in the landscape of Berlin is  Mount Forist, rising over the west side of the city. Approximately half of Berlin lies within the Connecticut River watershed, and half lies in the Androscoggin River watershed.

 Rivers 

 Androscoggin River
 Dead River (New Hampshire)
 Upper Ammonoosuc River

Climate

Like all of northern New England, except the highest mountains, Berlin has a warm-summer humid continental climate (Köppen Dfb) characterized by cold, snowy winters and warm summers. It can be expected that each year on average 68 afternoons will not top freezing, that 34.4 mornings will fall to or below , and that 180.5 mornings will fall to or below freezing point. The average window for days not topping freezing is November 14 to March 29, and for subzero lows from December 11 to March 12.

 Demographics 

As of the census of 2010, there were 10,051 people, 4,178 households, and 2,515 families residing in the town. There were 4,910 housing units, of which 732, or 14.9%, were vacant. The racial makeup of the town was 96.5% white, 0.8% African American, 0.4% Native American, 0.3% Asian, 0.0% Native Hawaiian or Pacific Islander, 0.2% some other race, and 1.8% from two or more races. 1.5% of the population were Hispanic or Latino of any race.

Of the 4,178 households, 25.8% had children under the age of 18 living with them, 43.2% were headed by married couples living together, 11.8% had a female householder with no husband present, and 39.8% were non-families. 33.3% of all households were made up of individuals, and 15.2% were someone living alone who was 65 years of age or older. The average household size was 2.18, and the average family size was 2.71. 955 city residents lived in group quarters rather than households.

In the city, 18.4% of the population were under the age of 18, 7.8% were from 18 to 24, 24.3% from 25 to 44, 29.4% from 45 to 64, and 20.0% were 65 years of age or older. The median age was 44.7 years. For every 100 females, there were 111.7 males. For every 100 females age 18 and over, there were 110.6 males.

For the period 2011–2015, the estimated median annual income for a household was $35,523, and the median income for a family was $49,103. The per capita income for the town was $21,348. 20.3% of the population and 18.1% of families were below the poverty line. 34.3% of the population under the age of 18 and 11.0% of those 65 or older were living in poverty.

The population of Berlin rose rapidly from 1880 through 1930. The population went from 1,144 in 1880 to 20,018 in 1930. A slow decline began after 1930, interrupted only by a temporary increase around 1960. From 1960–present, the population of Berlin has decreased, from 17,821 in 1960 to 9,425 in 2020.

In the 1930s, Berlin was at its peak for population and economic growth. The population in 1930 was over 20,000 people, the most the city has ever had. Main Street in downtown had many family-owned businesses which would attract many people in the city. The Nansen Ski Jump just north of the city limits in Milan was a highlight for Berlin. Built in 1936, it was the largest ski jump in the eastern United States for almost 50 years, until it closed in 1988. It was fully restored in the beginning of 2017.

 Government 

In the New Hampshire Senate, Berlin is included in the 1st District and is currently represented by Republican Erin Hennessey. In the New Hampshire House of Representatives, Berlin is included in the Coös 3rd District and is currently represented by Democrats Eamon Kelley, Larry Laflamme and Republican Robert Theberge. On the New Hampshire Executive Council, Berlin is in the 1st District and is represented by Republican Joseph Kenney. In the United States House of Representatives, Berlin is in New Hampshire's 2nd congressional district and is currently represented by Democrat Ann McLane Kuster.

 Notable people 

 Gaston Allaire (1916–2011), music educator and composer in Canada
 William Robinson Brown (1875–1955), corporate officer of the Brown Company and a noted horse breeder
 Robert N. Chamberlain (1856–1917), Speaker of the New Hampshire House of Representatives, second Chief Justice of the New Hampshire Superior Court
 James Gilbert Chandler (1856–1924), architect
 Jacalyn "Jackie" Cilley (born 1951), member of the New Hampshire House of Representatives, former state senator
 Lew Cody (1884–1934), actor during the 1920s and '30s
 William E. Corbin (1869–1951), inventor of the Nibroc paper towel
 Michael Durant (born 1961), U.S. Army Night Stalkers pilot, shot down and held prisoner after the Battle of Mogadishu
 Dennis "Red" Gendron (1957–2021), head coach of the University of Maine Black Bear men's ice hockey team, former New Jersey Devils and Yale Bulldogs coach
Odore Joseph Gendron (1921–2020), former curate of Guardian Angel Roman Catholic Church who became Bishop of Manchester  
 Bruce Halle (1930-2018), founder of Discount Tire
 Selden "Sel" Hannah (1913–1991), ski area designer
 Norman Hansen (1924–2014), engineer, politician
 George Hawkins, victim of a bad skin graft that led to the celebrated "Hairy Hand" case of Hawkins v. McGee Ted Hodgdon (1902–1984), motorcycle journalist 
 James H. Horne (1874–1959), athletic director and coach at Indiana University
 Archibald I. Lawrence (1869–1950), architect
 Albert E. Martel (?–1965), former government official
John Ramsey (1927–1990), public address announcer
 Elizabeth Raum (born 1945), Canadian oboist, composer
 Lowell Reed (1886–1966), co-creator of the Reed–Frost model; seventh president of Johns Hopkins University
 Joseph Royer (1884–1965), operatic baritone
 Earl Silas Tupper (1907–1983), inventor of Tupperware
 Bob Whitcher (1917–1997), pitcher with the Boston Braves

 Education 

Public schools
Public education is managed by Berlin Public Schools (Superintendent: Julie King, as of 2019–2020 school year):
Berlin Middle High School (Grades 6 through 12)
 Berlin Elementary School (formerly the Middle and Hillside Elementary Schools) (Grades K through 5)

Higher education
 White Mountains Community College (member of the Community College System of New Hampshire)

Public safety

Law enforcement
Law enforcement is provided by the Berlin Police Department. The Berlin police station is currently located at 135 Green Street on the corner of Green and Gilbert Streets, and First Avenue. The present structure was completed in 1927, first serving as an armory for the New Hampshire Army National Guard. The building later became the police station when the current armory was erected, replacing the out-of-date, smaller Cole Street station.

The Berlin Police Department has 21 full-time officers, 17 part-time auxiliary/special enforcement officers, and ten civilian personnel. There is a communications specialist working dispatch at all times of the day.

Fire department
The Berlin Fire Department is currently located at 263 Main Street. Historically, the fire department had three fire stations, the Eastside station (below the former King School), the Berlin Mills station (on Upper Main Street, near Brown School), and the Central station (present building).

ATV/OHRV riding

The city of Berlin allows any ATV/OHRV to ride on city streets, as long as the operator is 18 years or older and can provide a driver's license.

Berlin is home to the Jericho Mountain ATV Festival that is held every year in the first weekend of August. The event draws thousands of people to ride through some of New Hampshire's trails that are offered to ATV riders.

Coos County offers a great amount of trails for ATV riders, connecting Berlin to the towns of Gorham, Milan, Errol, Groveton, Stratford, Colebrook, and Pittsburg. The Success trails lead riders from Berlin north to Milan and Errol. The Millsfield trails then go northwest from Errol, connecting with the North Country Trail from Groveton. From there, the Great North Woods Trails head north to the town of Pittsburg, the northernmost town in New Hampshire.

Trails throughout the city and Jericho Mountain State Park are closed from the end of snowboard season until May 23 of every year (mud season).

 Transportation 
The major roads serving Berlin are New Hampshire Routes 16 and 110. NH 16 connects Berlin with Gorham and eventually North Conway to the south and Milan and Errol to the north. NH 110 begins in downtown Berlin and travels northwest through West Milan and Stark, ending in Groveton.

Berlin serves as the northern terminus of the Berlin–Conway–New Hampton route of Concord Coach Lines.

Two airports are located nearby to Berlin, Berlin Regional Airport and Gorham Airport.

Media

Radio stations
 WKDR 1490 AM: Classic Hits and Classic Rock
 WMOU 1230 AM: Hot Adult Contemporary (simulcast on 106.1 F.M..)
 WVMJ 98.1 FM: Top 40 (simulcast on 104.5 FM)

Other stations that can be heard in the area can be found here:

 Documentaries At the River's Edge, an award-winning oral history of Berlin

Newspaper
 The Berlin Daily Sun The Berlin Reporter In popular culture 

Many scenes in the 1927 silent film The Masked Menace were shot in Berlin.
The main character in Thomas Williams' book The Hair of Harold Roux was born in Berlin.
Sean Bateman, the main character in Bret Easton Ellis' Rules of Attraction, vacationed in Berlin.
In the novel Last Night in Twisted River by John Irving, most of the characters are supposed to be employed by paper mills based in Berlin.
In Stephen King's novel The Shining, the character Jack Torrance grew up in Berlin and often describes his childhood there.
In Julian May's Galactic Milieu Series, the narrator Uncle Rogi grows up in Berlin. Many of the pivotal events in the series are set near Berlin, on Mount Washington.
In Lionel Shriver's novel So Much for That'', the protagonist grew up in Berlin, and is obliged to return to his family home to help take care of his father.
The 2019 Endeavour podcast, Blackout, produced by Rami Malek, is based in Berlin.

Sports 
The city's Notre Dame Arena had a team in the low-level professional Federal Hockey League called the Berlin River Drivers from 2015 to 2017. In 2018, the Quebec-based Ligue Nord-Américaine de Hockey minor professional league added the Berlin BlackJacks, but the team was relocated to Saint-Jérôme, Quebec, by December 2018.

Inventions 

The following items were created in Berlin:

 Bermico, a type of pipe that were produced by the Brown Company in the 1920s–1970s
 Cellulose floc, developed by the Brown Company
 Farrand Rapid Rule, created by Hiram A. Farrand Inc. but later sold to Stanley Works
 Iron rigging, an object for skis made by Olaf Oleson and later sold to the Northland Ski Company of Minnesota
 Kream Krisp, a substance like Crisco created by the Brown Company, which led to lawsuit known as "Procter and Gamble vs. the Brown Company"
 Nibroc Paper Towels, developed by William E. Corbin and mass-produced by the Brown Company

Historic sites 

Berlin is home to the following sites listed on the National Register of Historic Places:

 Congregational Church, added in 1980
 George E. Burgess School, added in 2015
 Holy Resurrection Orthodox Church, added in 1979
 Mt. Jasper Lithic Source, added in 1992
 St. Anne Church, added in 1979

Sites of interest 
 Nansen Ski Jump
 The Berlin & Coös County Historical Society (BCCHS)
 Moffett House Museum and Genealogical Center
 Notre Dame Arena
 Service Credit Union Heritage Park
 Jericho Mountain State Park

See also

 Mill town
 Paper mill
 Pulp and paper industry

References

External links

 
 BerlinNH.net, community informational website and blog
 New Hampshire Economic & Labor Market Information Bureau Profile
 Video - NADC Purchases Pulp Mill in Berlin, New Hampshire
 Beyond Brown Paper, the photo archives of the Brown Company covering 1885 through 1965

 
Berlin, New Hampshire micropolitan area
Cities in Coös County, New Hampshire
Cities in New Hampshire
Company towns in New Hampshire
French-Canadian culture in New Hampshire
Populated places established in 1829